Vid Poteko (born 5 April 1991) is a Slovenian handball player who plays for Frisch Auf Göppingen and the Slovenian national team.

He competed at the 2016 European Men's Handball Championship and at the 2016 Summer Olympics.

References

External links

 

1991 births
Living people
Slovenian male handball players
Sportspeople from Celje
Olympic handball players of Slovenia
Handball players at the 2016 Summer Olympics
Expatriate handball players
Slovenian expatriate sportspeople in Belarus
Slovenian expatriate sportspeople in Germany
Frisch Auf Göppingen players
Handball-Bundesliga players
21st-century Slovenian people